Gonzo journalism is a style of journalism that is written without claims of objectivity, often including the reporter as part of the story using a first-person narrative. The word "gonzo" is believed to have been first used in 1970 to describe an article about the Kentucky Derby by Hunter S. Thompson, who popularized the style. It is an energetic first-person participatory writing style in which the author is a protagonist, and it draws its power from a combination of social critique and self-satire. It has since been applied to other subjective artistic endeavors.

Gonzo journalism involves an approach to accuracy that concerns the reporting of personal experiences and emotions, in contrast to traditional journalism, which favors a detached style and relies on facts or quotations that can be verified by third parties. Gonzo journalism disregards the strictly-edited product once favored by newspaper media and strives for a more personal approach; the personality of a piece is as important as the event or actual subject of the piece. Use of sarcasm, humor, exaggeration, and profanity is common.

Thompson, who was among the forefathers of the New Journalism movement, said in the February 15, 1973, issue of Rolling Stone, "If I'd written the truth I knew for the past ten years, about 600 people—including me—would be rotting in prison cells from Rio to Seattle today. Absolute truth is a very rare and dangerous commodity in the context of professional journalism."

Etymology 

The term "gonzo" was first used in connection with Hunter S. Thompson by The Boston Globe magazine editor Bill Cardoso in 1970. He described Thompson's article "The Kentucky Derby Is Decadent and Depraved", which was written for the June 1970 edition of Scanlan's Monthly, as "pure Gonzo journalism". This predates the December 1970 debut of the Muppet of that name. Cardoso said "gonzo" was South Boston Irish slang describing the last man standing after an all-night drinking marathon. He also said it was a corruption of the French Canadian word gonzeaux, which means "shining path", although this is disputed.

Another speculation is that the word may have been inspired by the 1960 hit song "Gonzo" by New Orleans rhythm and blues pianist James Booker. This possibility is supported by a 2007 oral biography of Thompson, which states that the term is taken from a song by Booker but does not explain why Thompson or Cardoso would have chosen the term to describe Thompson's journalism. The 2013 documentary Bayou Maharaja: The Tragic Genius of James Booker quotes Thompson's literary executor as saying that the song was the origin of the term. According to a Greg Johnson biographical note on Booker, the song title "Gonzo" comes from a character in a movie called The Pusher, which in turn may have been inspired by a 1956 Evan Hunter novel of the same title.

Thompson himself first used the term referring to his own work on page 12 of the counterculture classic Fear and Loathing in Las Vegas. He wrote, "But what was the story? Nobody had bothered to say. So we would have to drum it up on our own. Free Enterprise. The American Dream. Horatio Alger gone mad on drugs in Las Vegas. Do it now: pure Gonzo journalism."

Hunter S. Thompson 

Thompson based his style on William Faulkner's notion that "fiction is often the best fact". While the things that Thompson wrote about are basically true, he used satirical devices to drive his points home. He often wrote about recreational drugs and alcohol use, which added subjective flair to his reporting. The term "gonzo" has also come into (sometimes pejorative) use to describe journalism in Thompson's style, characterized by a drug-fueled stream of consciousness writing technique.

Fear and Loathing in Las Vegas followed the Mint 400 piece in 1971 and included a main character by the name of Raoul Duke, accompanied by his attorney, Dr. Gonzo, with defining art by Ralph Steadman. Although this book is considered a prime example of gonzo journalism, Thompson regarded it as a failed experiment. He had intended it to be an unedited record of everything he did as it happened, but he edited the book five times before publication.

Thompson would instigate events himself, often in a prankish or belligerent manner, and then document both his actions and those of others. Notoriously neglectful of deadlines, Thompson often annoyed his editors because he submitted articles late, "too late to be edited, yet still in time for the printer". Thompson wanted his work to be read as he wrote it, in its "true Gonzo" form. Historian Douglas Brinkley said gonzo journalism requires virtually no rewriting and frequently uses transcribed interviews and verbatim telephone conversations.

"I don't get any satisfaction out of the old traditional journalist's view: 'I just covered the story. I just gave it a balanced view, Thompson said in an interview for the online edition of The Atlantic. "Objective journalism is one of the main reasons American politics has been allowed to be so corrupt for so long. You can't be objective about Nixon."

Influence 

Thompson felt that objectivity in journalism was a myth. Gonzo journalism has now become a bona fide style of writing that is similar to the New Journalism of the 1960s, led primarily by Tom Wolfe and also championed by Lester Bangs, George Plimpton, Terry Southern, and John Birmingham, and is considered a subgenre of New Journalism. When asked whether there was a difference between the two, Thompson answered, "Yeah, I think so. Unlike Tom Wolfe or Gay Talese, for instance, I almost never try to reconstruct a story. They're both much better reporters than I am, but then I don't really think of myself as a reporter."

In 1998, Christopher Locke asserted that the webzine genre is descended from gonzo journalism, a claim that has since been extended to social media. Thompson's gonzo journalism influence is reflected in the current website Gonzo Today which features a top banner by Thompson's longtime illustrator Ralph Steadman, with rotating contributions by others including Thompson associate, poet Ron Whitehead.

See also 

 Citizen journalism
 Creative nonfiction
 Embedded journalism
 Gonzo pornography
 Immersion journalism
 New Games Journalism
 New Journalism
 Nonfiction novel
 Reportage
 Transmetropolitan

Citations

General sources

External links 

 
 Gonzo Today – Independent gonzo journalism website with some contributions from Thompson illustrator Ralph Steadman

Hunter S. Thompson
Journalism ethics
Newswriting
Types of journalism